Bill Dickie may refer to:
 Bill Dickie (ice hockey) (1916–1997), Canadian ice hockey goaltender
 Bill Dickie (association football) (1929–2012), President of the Scottish Football Association
 Bill Dickie (politician), former corporate lawyer and politician from Alberta, Canada
 Bill Dickie (footballer) (1893–1960), footballer for Chelsea and Stoke

See also
 William Dickie (1869–1921), Liberal Party Member of Parliament in New Zealand